Barry McKenzie (14 August 1945 – 6 July 2021) was an Australian rules footballer who played for the Fitzroy Football Club in the Victorian Football League (VFL) and West Torrens in the South Australian Football League (SANFL).

Notes

External links 
		

1945 births
2021 deaths
Australian rules footballers from Victoria (Australia)
Coleraine Football Club players
Fitzroy Football Club players
West Torrens Football Club players